Brachypnoea texana is a species of leaf beetle. It is found in North America. It was first described by the American entomologist Charles Frederic August Schaeffer in 1919.

References

Further reading

 
 
 
 
 
 

Eumolpinae
Articles created by Qbugbot
Beetles described in 1919
Beetles of the United States
Taxa named by Charles Frederic August Schaeffer